Rainbow Edition is a studio album by British musical duo Hype Williams. It was released in August 2017 under Big Dada.

Accolades

Track listing

References

2017 albums
Hype Williams (band) albums
Big Dada albums